The Malta women's national football team represents the Malta Football Association in international women's football matches sanctioned by UEFA.

History

The team first appeared in official competitions in the 2005 European Championship's qualifying, debuting on August 10, 2003 in Bucharest with a 3–0 loss to Romania. Malta lost all eight games, scoring once and conceding 35. The team's first goal was scored by Sarah Caruana on November 16, 2003, against Croatia.

After 13 losses, Malta achieved its first draw on June 7, 2006 against Bosnia and Herzegovina in the last match of the 2007 World Cup's qualifying. The team played in the 2011 World Cup's qualifying, losing all games including a record 0–13 defeat to Spain. On March 3, 2011 Malta won an official match for the first time in the 2013 European Championship qualifying's preliminary round, beating Georgia 1–0 with a goal by D'Agostino in injury time.

On April 6, 2013 Malta beat Luxembourg 6–0 in the 2015 World Cup qualifying's preliminary round. The team also defeated Latvia and drew with Albania to top the group and make it past a preliminary round for the first time.

The team was coached from its foundation until 2015 by Pierre Brincat, and then from 22 January 2015 till now by former U19 coach Mark Gatt.

Team image

Home stadium
The Malta women's national team play their home matches on the Centenary Stadium.

Overall official record

Results and fixtures

The following is a list of match results in the last 12 months, as well as any future matches that have been scheduled.

2022

2023

Official Malta Fixtures (Friendly matches only) – MFA.com.mt
Official Malta Results (Friendly matches only) – MFA.com.mt
Malta Results and Fixtures – Soccerway.com

Coaching staff

Current coaching staff

Manager history

 Pierre Brincat (????–2015)
Mark Gatt (2015–)

Players

Current squad
The following players were named in the squad for the 2023 World Cup qualification matches against Russia and Azerbaijan on 21 and 26 October 2021.

Recent call-ups

The following players were also named to a squad in the last 12 months.

Captains

Dorianne Theuma (????–????)
Emma Lipman (????–)

Records

*Active players in bold, statistics correct as of July 2021.

Most capped players

Below is a list of the 10 players with the most caps for Malta.

Top goalscorers

Competitive record

FIFA Women's World Cup

*Draws include knockout matches decided on penalty kicks.

UEFA Women's Championship

*Draws include knockout matches decided on penalty kicks.

Honours

See also
Malta International Football Tournament

Sport in Malta
Football in Malta
Women's football in Malta
Malta women's national football team
Malta women's national under-20 football team
Malta women's national under-17 football team
Malta men's national football team
Malta men's national under-21 football team
Malta men's national under-19 football team
Malta men's national under-17 football team

Notes

References

External links
Official website 
FIFA profile

 
European women's national association football teams